Lubjana Piovesana (born 4 January 1997) is a British judoka.

She is the U23 European Champion. She is the bronze medallist of the 2019 Judo Grand Prix Marrakesh in the -63 kg category. In addition she is the youngest medalist from Great Britain on the International Judo World Tour.

In 2022 she fought in the Austrian Damen-Bundesliga for the team UJZ Mühlviertel. Piovesana had four matches and won three of them. She only lost against Michaela Polleres.

Since January 2023 Piovesana is part of the Austria National Team.

She is in a relationship with Laurin Boehler.

References

External links

 
 
 

1997 births
Living people
British female judoka
Austrian female judoka